Aellopos clavipes, also known as the clavipes sphinx, is a moth of the  family Sphingidae.

Distribution 
It lives mainly in Central America but ranges from Venezuela to California, Arizona, and Texas in the United States.

Description 

The body is dark brown with a wide white band across the abdomen. The wings are dark brown. The forewing has a black cell spot and three white spots near the pale brown marginal area.

Biology 

Adults are on wing from May to December in Costa Rica. There are probably three main generations with adults on wing in December, from April to May and in September.

The larvae feed on various Rubiaceae species, including Randia rhagocarpa, Randia monantha, Randia aculeata, Guettarda macrosperma and Genipa americana. Pupation takes place in shallow underground chambers.

Subspecies
Aellopos clavipes clavipes
Aellopos clavipes eumelas (Jordan, 1924) (Jamaica)

References

External links
Clavipes Sphinx Butterflies and Moths of North America

Aellopos
Moths of North America
Sphingidae of South America
Moths described in 1903